The Semiahmoo Indian Reserve is a 129.1-hectare Indian reserve in the Lower Mainland, British Columbia, located on Semiahmoo Bay between the City of White Rock and Peace Arch Park, which sits astride the international boundary with Washington state.

The reserve is under the administration of the Semiahmoo First Nation, which is the band government of the Semiahmoo people, a North Straits Salish-speaking subgroup of the Coast Salish.  Currently the people of Semiahmoo's chief is Harley Chappell (since 2017).

The Semiahmoo Reserve was established by the Canadian government in 1887.

See also
Campbell River (Semiahmoo Bay)
List of Indian Reserves in British Columbia

References

Indian and Northern Affairs Canada page

Indian reserves in the Lower Mainland